The Lucas sequence is an integer sequence named after the mathematician François Édouard Anatole Lucas (1842–1891), who studied both that sequence and the closely related Fibonacci sequence. Individual numbers in the Lucas sequence are known as Lucas numbers. Lucas numbers and Fibonacci numbers form complementary instances of Lucas sequences. 

The Lucas sequence has the same recursive relationship as the Fibonacci sequence, where each term is the sum of the two previous terms, but with different starting values. This produces a sequence where the ratios of successive terms approach the golden ratio, and in fact the terms themselves are roundings of integer powers of the golden ratio. The sequence also has a variety of relationships with the Fibonacci numbers, like the fact that adding any two Fibonacci numbers two terms apart in the Fibonacci sequence results in the Lucas number in between.

The first few Lucas numbers are 
 2, 1, 3, 4, 7, 11, 18, 29, 47, 76, 123, 199, 322, 521, 843, 1364, 2207, 3571, 5778, 9349, ... .

Definition 
As with the Fibonacci numbers, each Lucas number is defined to be the sum of its two immediately previous terms, thereby forming a Fibonacci integer sequence. Though closely related in definition, Lucas and Fibonacci numbers exhibit distinct properties.

The Lucas numbers may thus be defined as follows:

(where n belongs to the natural numbers)

All Fibonacci-like integer sequences appear in shifted form as a row of the Wythoff array; the Fibonacci sequence itself is the first row and the Lucas sequence is the second row. Also like all Fibonacci-like integer sequences, the ratio between two consecutive Lucas numbers converges to the golden ratio.

Extension to negative integers
Using , one can extend the Lucas numbers to negative integers to obtain a doubly infinite sequence: 
..., −11, 7, −4, 3, −1, 2, 1, 3, 4, 7, 11, ...
The formula for terms with negative indices in this sequence is

Relationship to Fibonacci numbers

The Lucas numbers are related to the Fibonacci numbers by many identities.  Among these are the following:
 
 
 
 
 
 , so .
 
 ; in particular, so .

Their closed formula is given as:

where  is the golden ratio.

Combining the above with Binet's formula,

For integers n ≥ 2, we also get:

with remainder R satisfying

.

Lucas identities

Many of the Fibonacci identities have parallels in Lucas numbers. For example, the Cassini identity becomes

Also

where .

For example if n is odd,  and 

Checking, and

Generating function

Let

be the generating function of the Lucas numbers. By a direct computation,

which can be rearranged as

 gives the generating function for the negative indexed Lucas numbers, and

 satisfies the functional equation

As the generating function for the Fibonacci numbers is given by

we have

which proves that

and

proves that

The partial fraction decomposition is given by

This can be used to prove the generating function, as

Congruence relations

 is congruent to 1 modulo  if  is prime, but some composite values of  also have this property. These are the Fibonacci pseudoprimes.

 is congruent to 0 modulo 5.

Lucas primes 

A Lucas prime is a Lucas number that is prime. The first few Lucas primes are
2, 3, 7, 11, 29, 47, 199, 521, 2207, 3571, 9349, 3010349, 54018521, 370248451, 6643838879, ... .

The indices of these primes are (for example, L4 = 7)
0, 2, 4, 5, 7, 8, 11, 13, 16, 17, 19, 31, 37, 41, 47, 53, 61, 71, 79, 113, 313, 353, 503, 613, 617, 863, 1097, 1361, 4787, 4793, 5851, 7741, 8467, ... .
, the largest confirmed Lucas prime is L148091, which has 30950 decimal digits. , the largest known Lucas probable prime is L5466311, with 1,142,392 decimal digits.

If Ln is prime then n is 0, prime, or a power of 2. L2m is prime for m = 1, 2, 3, and 4 and no other known values of m.

Lucas polynomials
In the same way as Fibonacci polynomials are derived from the Fibonacci numbers, the Lucas polynomials  are a polynomial sequence derived from the Lucas numbers.

Continued fractions for powers of the golden ratio 
Close rational approximations for powers of the golden ratio can be obtained from their continued fractions.

For positive integers n, the continued fractions are:

.

For example:

is the limit of

with the error in each term being about 1% of the error in the previous term; and

is the limit of

with the error in each term being about 0.3% that of the second previous term.

Applications
Lucas numbers are the second most common pattern in sunflowers after Fibonacci numbers, when clockwise and counter-clockwise spirals are counted, according to an analysis of 657 sunflowers in 2016.

See also
Generalizations of Fibonacci numbers

References

External links
 
 
 
 "The Lucas Numbers", Dr Ron Knott
 Lucas numbers and the Golden Section
 A Lucas Number Calculator can be found here.
 

Integer sequences
Fibonacci numbers
Recurrence relations
Unsolved problems in mathematics

bn:লুকাস ধারা
fr:Suite de Lucas
he:סדרת לוקאס
pt:Sequência de Lucas